This is a list of bridges and other crossings of the Columbia River from the Pacific Ocean upstream to its source.

Crossings

See also

 List of crossings of the Willamette River
 Lists of Oregon-related topics
 Outline of Washington (state)
 List of British Columbia-related topics

References

External links

Columbia River crossings
Crossings
Columbia River
Columbia